The Man from Thunder River is a 1943 American Western film directed by John English and written by J. Benton Cheney. The film stars Wild Bill Elliott, George "Gabby" Hayes, Anne Jeffreys, Ian Keith, John James and Georgie Cooper. The film was released on June 11, 1943, by Republic Pictures.

Plot

Cast  
Wild Bill Elliott as Wild Bill Elliott 
George "Gabby" Hayes as Gabby Whittaker
Anne Jeffreys as Nancy Ferguson
Ian Keith as Henry Stevens
John James as Jack Ferguson
Georgie Cooper as Bess Ferguson
Jack Ingram as Les
Eddie Lee as Wong
Charles King as Henchman
Jack Rockwell as Sheriff

References

External links
 

1943 films
American Western (genre) films
1943 Western (genre) films
Republic Pictures films
Films directed by John English
American black-and-white films
1940s English-language films
1940s American films